The women's 4 x 100 metres relay at the 1958 European Athletics Championships was held in Stockholm, Sweden, at Stockholms Olympiastadion on 23 and 24 August 1958.

Medalists

Results

Final
24 August

Heats
23 August

Heat 1

Heat 2

Participation
According to an unofficial count, 36 athletes from 9 countries participated in the event.

 (4)
 (4)
 (4)
 (4)
 (4)
 (4)
 (4)
 (4)
 (4)

References

4 x 100 metres relay
Relays at the European Athletics Championships
Euro